Zarzamin (Russian and Tajik: Зарзамин, formerly: Katagan) is a village and jamoat in north-west Tajikistan. It is located in Ghafurov District in Sughd Region. The jamoat has a total population of 12,744 (2015).

References

Populated places in Sughd Region
Jamoats of Tajikistan